Tolstoy (Russian "Толстой") is a noble Russian family name derived from the Russian adjective "то́лстый" ("thick, stout, fat").

The family name is shared by three major Russian writers of the 19th-20th centuries, of whom two also share first names Alexei, and one of these has the same patronymic Nikolaevich (Nicholas's son) with the best known of them - Lev or Leo Tolstoy (1828–1910).

Tolstoy (Rus. masculine), Tolstaya (Rus. feminine), or Tolstoye may also refer to:

People
 Tolstoy (family), Nobility with origins in the 15th century
 Aleksey Nikolayevich Tolstoy (1883–1945) 'Comrade Count', writer of science fiction and historical novels.
 Aleksey Konstantinovich Tolstoy (1817–1875), poet and writer of historical dramas, second cousin of Leo Tolstoy.
 Alexander Ivanovich Ostermann-Tolstoy (1770–1857), soldier, later  military consultant to Ibrahim-pasha in Egypt
 Alexandra Tolstaya (1884–1970), youngest daughter of Leo Tolstoy and founder of Tolstoy Foundation
 Alexandra Tolstoy (born 1974), born Alexandra Tolstoy-Miloslavsky, British equine adventurer, broadcaster and businesswoman
 Dmitry Tolstoy (1823–1889), Russian statesman and historian
 Fyodor Tolstoy (disambiguation)
Fyodor Petrovich Tolstoy (1783–1873), Russian artist
Fyodor Ivanovich Tolstoy (The American) (1782–1846), Fyodor Petrovich's cousin, Russian adventurer and bonvivant
 Ilya Tolstoy (1866–1933), writer and son of Leo Tolstoy
 Ilya Andreyevich Tolstoy (1903–1970),  U.S. Army Colonel, F. D. Roosevelt's envoy in Tibet, grandson of Leo Tolstoy
 Natalia Tolstaya (1943–2010), writer and translator 
 Nikolai Tolstoy (born 1935), English-Russian author and former parliamentary candidate of the UK Independence Party.
 Pyotr Aleksandrovich Tolstoy (1769–1844), general and statesman
 Pyotr Andreyevich Tolstoy (1645–1729), statesman and diplomat
 Sophia Tolstaya (1844–1919), diarist and wife of Leo Tolstoy.
 Svetlana Tolstaya (born 1971), Kazakh race walker
 Tatyana Tolstaya (born 1951), Russian writer and TV host, mother of Artemy Lebedev, Russian designer and businessman (born 1974)
 Viktoria Tolstoy (born 1974), Swedish jazz singer
 Yegor Tolstoy (1802–1874), Russian lieutenant-general, senator, and governor
 Tatyana Sukhotina-Tolstaya (1864 – 1950), Russian painter and memoirist, oldest daughter of Leo Tolstoy.
 Pyotr Olegovich Tolstoy (born 1974), Russian journalist and statesman

Other uses
 Tolstoy House, a building in St. Petersburg, Russia
 Tolstoy Cup, an annual student football match in England
 Tolstoy Foundation
 Tolstoi, Manitoba, Canada
 Tolstoy, South Dakota, US
 Moscow Conference (1944), code name Tolstoy

See also
 Lev-Tolstovsky (disambiguation)